Laidley may refer to:
Laidley (name)

Places

Australia 

Laidley, Queensland, a town in South East Queensland, Australia
Laidley Valley (Mulgowie) railway line
Laidley Golf Club
Town of Laidley, a former local government area comprising Laidley, Queensland
Shire of Laidley, a former local government area in Queensland
Laidley Creek West, Queensland, a locality in the Lockyer Valley Region
Laidley Heights, Queensland, a locality in the Lockyer Valley Region
Laidley North, Queensland, a locality in the Lockyer Valley Region
Laidley South, Queensland, a locality in the Lockyer Valley Region

United States 

Laidley Tower in Charleston, West Virginia, U.S.